The 1994 ICF Canoe Sprint World Championships were held in Mexico City, Mexico for the second time at neighboring Xochimilco. The Mexican city had hosted the event previously in 1974 at the same venue that hosted the canoeing and rowing competitions for the 1968 Summer Olympics.

The men's competition consisted of nine Canadian (single paddle, open boat) and nine kayak events. Six events were held for the women, all in kayak. The 10000 m events for men (Two canoe and three kayak) and 5000 m events for women (two in kayak) were dropped from the program (Three events at 5000 m (men's C-1, and men's and women's K-1) resumed at the 2010 championships.) and the 200 m events for C-1, C-2, and C-4 (men only), and K-1, K-2, and K-4 (both men and women) took their place. This represented the greatest change in the championships program since their reconstitution in 1950 following both World War II and the 1948 Summer Olympics.

This was the 26th championships in canoe sprint.

Medal summary

Men's

Canoe

Kayak

Women's

Kayak

Medals table

References
ICF medalists for Olympic and World Championships - Part 1: flatwater (now sprint): 1936-2007.
ICF medalists for Olympic and World Championships - Part 2: rest of flatwater (now sprint) and remaining canoeing disciplines: 1936-2007.

C
C
ICF Canoe Sprint World Championships
C
Canoeing and kayaking competitions in Mexico